Jinming District was a district of Henan, China. It was under the administration of Kaifeng city. In 2005 it was merged with Longting District.

County-level divisions of Henan